The Chinese Ambassador to Guinea-Bissau is the official representative of the People's Republic of China to Guinea-Bissau.

List of representatives

See also
China–Guinea-Bissau relations

References 

Ambassadors of China to Guinea-Bissau
Guinea-Bissau
China